is a railway station in the city of Anjō, Aichi, Japan, operated by Meitetsu.

Lines

Station layout
The station is an elevated station with two opposed side platforms and the station building underneath. The station is staffed.

Platforms

Adjacent stations

Station history
Minami Anjō Station was opened on July 1, 1926 as a station on the privately held Hekikai Electric Railway. Hekikai Electric Railway merged with the Meitetsu Group on May 1, 1944. The station was reconstructed in 1961, and the tracks were elevated in May 1981. The station has been unattended since October 11, 2007.

Passenger statistics
In fiscal 2017, the station was used by an average of 5,026 passengers daily (boarding passengers only).

Surrounding area
 Anjō Gakuen High School
 Anjō City History Museum

See also
 List of Railway Stations in Japan

References

External links

 Official web page 

Railway stations in Japan opened in 1926
Railway stations in Aichi Prefecture
Stations of Nagoya Railroad
Anjō, Aichi